The following is a list of proposed subdivisions of the Philippines under a federal form of government.

This list includes nation-wide scale proposals as well as localized proposals for the formation of a federal state.

Country-wide proposals

Local state proposals
The following includes proposals which are forwarded by inhabitants and/or local officials in the area of the proposed federal state. These proposals may or may not be included in the listed country-wide proposals mentioned above.

Bansa Sug / Zambasulta – At the Bangsa Sug Summit in 2018, participants of the convention including claimants of the Sultanate of Sulu, called for the creation of a Bansa Sug federal state consisting of the Sulu archipelago provinces and Zamboanga Peninsula. They also campaigned for the option to "opt-out" from the then-proposed Bangsamoro autonomous region.

Negros Island  – Following the abolition of the Negros Island Region in 2017 and the ongoing campaign of President Rodrigo Duterte for a shift of the Philippines's form of government to federalism, there are calls for the Negros island, consisting of Negros Occidental and Negros Oriental provinces, to be made into a single federal state or at least integrate the whole island in a larger single state if a federal form of government is adopted for the country. Negros Occidental 2nd District representative Rafael Leo Cueva said that the proposal is in line with the "One Island, One Region" movement which calls for the unification of the two provinces under a single region which began in the 1980s

References

Federalism in the Philippines
Federal states